Nina Munteanu (born 1954 in Granby, Quebec) is a Canadian ecologist and novelist of science fiction and fantasy. In addition to eight published novels, Munteanu has written short stories, articles and non-fiction books, which have been translated into several languages throughout the world. Munteanu is a member of SF Canada. She writes articles on the environment and sustainability.

Many of her novels and short stories examine the role and evolution of humanity in the context of nature and technology. She is currently an editor of European SF zine Europa SF. Munteanu taught Environmental Education at the Summer Institute of Simon Fraser University for several years. Munteanu was a scientist with several consulting firms in Vancouver, British Columbia, where she did research and wrote reports and research papers. Munteanu lives in Toronto, Ontario, and Vancouver, British Columbia, where she teaches writing and consults as technical writer and editor.

Awards and honours
Recognition for her work includes the Midwest Book Review Reader’s Choice Award, finalist for Foreword Magazine’s Book of the Year Award, the SLF Fountain Award, and The Delta Optimist Reviewers Choice.

Bibliography

 Collision with Paradise (Liquid Silver, 2005)
 The Cypol (eXtasy Books, 2006)
 Darwin's Paradox (Dragon Moon Press, 2007)
 The Fiction Writer: Get Published, Write Now! (Starfire World Syndicate, 2009)
 Manual de Scriere Creativa. Scriitorul de fictiune (Editura Paralela, 2011)
 Angel of Chaos (Dragon Moon Press, 2010)
 Outer Diverse, Book 1 of The Splintered Universe Trilogy (Starfire World Syndicate, 2011)
 Inner Diverse, Book 2 (Starfire World Syndicate, 2012)
 Metaverse, Book 3 (Starfire World Syndicate, 2014)
 The Last Summoner (Starfire World Syndicate, 2012)
 The Journal Writer: Finding Your Voice (Pixl Press, 2013)
 Scriitorul de Jurnal. Descoperirea vocii interioare (Editura Paralela 45, 2012)
 Natural Selection: a collection of short stories (Pixl Press, 2013)
 Water Is...(Pixl Press, 2016)
 The Ecology of Story: World as Character (Pixl Press, 2019)
 A Diary in the Age of Water (Inanna Publications, 2020)

References

External links
Official Site of Nina Munteanu 
MUNTEANU, Nina. Author Bank. BC BookWorld. 
Nina Munteanu at the Internet Speculative Fiction Database
Fogel, Krista “The Self-Perceived Experience of Investigating Science with an Artistic Spirit: A Hermeneutic Phenomenological Study of High Ability Scientists Who Also Engage in the Arts” A Thesis submitted in partial fulfillment for the requirements for the Degree of Master of Arts, UBC, Vancouver, BC. 2008
Interview with Nina Munteanu observatorul.com
[https://torontoguardian.com/2018/10/toronto-writer-nina-munteanu/ "A Day in the Life" with Toronto writer Nina Munteanu
[https://prairiedogmag.com/sci-fi-writers-discuss-climate-catastrophe-nina-munteanu-author-of-darwins-paradox/ Sci-Fi Writers Discuss Climate Catastrophe: Nina Munteanu
[https://www.theglobeandmail.com/news/national/education/authors-push-science-beyond-the-lab-into-fiction-and-fantasy/article8975948/ Authors push science beyond the lab into fiction and fantasy
projects.thestar.com/climate-change-canada/what-you-can-do/

1954 births
Living people
Canadian ecologists
Women ecologists
Canadian science fiction writers
Canadian people of Romanian descent
Canadian women novelists
People from Granby, Quebec
Women science fiction and fantasy writers
Writers from Quebec
21st-century Canadian novelists
21st-century Canadian women writers
21st-century Canadian women scientists